Kernes Bloc — Successful Kharkiv is a political party of Ukraine, registered on April 12, 2016. The founder and first head of the political party was Hennadiy Kernes, who created it with the aim of participating in local elections in the Kharkiv Oblast, both in the City Council and in the Oblast Council.

History 
In 2016, the party was officially registered under the name "Unitary European Ukraine", therefore, Hennadiy Kernes himself had nothing to do with it.

At the end of 2019, the party was renamed into "Kernes Bloc — Successful Kharkiv", after which many rumors began to circulate around the party about its participation in the 2020 local elections, led by Mayor  of Kharkiv Hennadiy Kernes, which he himself did not deny.

Already in early 2020, Hennadiy Kernes announced that he was going to the elections to the Kharkiv City Council with his own bloc, without the Trust Deeds project, which he led together with Gennadiy Trukhanov and the Opposition Bloc, which did not participate in the local elections as a united front. in favor of small electoral blocs such as the Vadim Boychenko Bloc, Vilkul's Ukrainian Perspective Bloc, Volodymyr Buriak's Unity Party, and Gennady Trukhanov's Trust Deeds party.

The party declares 30 strategic steps for the development of the Kharkiv Oblast and Kharkiv itself. In relation to the central government, it positions itself as the opposition, and between Hennadiy Kernes and the former head of the Kharkiv Regional State Administration Oleksiy Kucher there were quite tense relations.

In the 2020 Mayoral election, Kernes won the first round of voting with a result of 61.2%, and the Kernes Block – Successful Kharkiv received a result of 37.98% in the Kharkiv City Council and 30.1% in the Kharkiv Oblast Council.

Kernes died on 17 December 2020. The snap mayoral election in Kharkiv to determinate Kernes successor was set on 31 October 2021. In this election Kernes Bloc — Successful Kharkiv nominated Ihor Terekhov as its mayoral candidate. Terekhov had been acting Kharkiv Mayor since 24 December 2020. Terekhov officially won the election with 50.66% of the votes. At an extraordinary session of the Kharkiv City Council on 11 November 2021 Terekhov was sworn in as the new Mayor of Kharkiv.

Election results

Kharkiv City Council

Kharkiv Oblast Council

Mayoral elections

Criticism 
Many opponents of Kernes, such as Yuliya Svitlychna, Ihar Chernyak and others, accused him of establishing his personal power in Kharkiv, corruption and budget embezzlement on various city projects. In particular, Kernes was accused of creating a mafia clan in Kharkiv and putting enormous pressure on small and medium-sized businesses.

Leadership 
Until his death on 17 December 2020, the actual head of the party was Hennadiy Kernes, but de jure the party leader since  19 October 2019 was Vyacheslav Orlov.

References

External links
Official Party page on Facebook
Official party page on Instagram
Official YouTube Channel

2016 establishments in Ukraine
Organizations based in Kharkiv
Political parties established in 2016
Political parties in Ukraine
Regionalist parties in Ukraine